Margus Allikmaa (born 28 June 1961, in Paldiski) is an Estonian theatre leader, cultural figure and politician. 2002-2003 he was Minister of Culture.

Allimaa began his career at the Estonian Drama Theatre in 1981, serving in several different positions; from 1991 until 1998 he was the head of the theatre. From 2007 until 2017, Allikmaa was the CEO of Eesti Rahvusringhääling. Since 2018, he has been the director of the Russian Theatre in Tallinn.

References

Living people
1961 births
Estonian theatre directors
Ministers of Culture of Estonia
Tallinn University of Technology alumni
People from Paldiski